Ribbon Fall, located in Yosemite National Park in California, flows off a cliff on the west side of El Capitan and is the longest single-drop waterfall in North America. The fall is fed by melting winter snow; while therefore dry for much of the year, the fall is a spectacular 1,612 feet (491 m) in the spring. In exceptional years, an ice cone develops at its base during the winter months similar to that which usually forms beneath Upper Yosemite Fall. This deposit can reach a depth of 200 feet, versus 322 feet for the greatest depth of the ice cone beneath the Upper Fall and Lower Fall.

References

Waterfalls of Yosemite National Park
Waterfalls of Mariposa County, California
Plunge waterfalls